Charles-François is a given name. Notable people with the name include:

 Charles-François de Broglie, marquis de Ruffec (1719–1791), French soldier and diplomat 
 Charles-François Lebrun, duc de Plaisance (1739–1824), Third Consul of France 

Compound given names